The Walt Disney Company CIS, LLC (also known as Disney Russia) is a Russian subsidiary of The Walt Disney Company, engaged in the production of films, television content, and also acts as a distribution through Walt Disney Studios. 

The Walt Disney Company CIS was founded in 2005. The company is engaged in licensing of consumer goods in Russia, the CIS countries, Georgia and Mongolia.

Divisions
 Walt Disney Studios (Distribution; currently halted)

Closed divisions
 Jetix (CIS)
 Jetix Play
 Disney Channel Russia (2010–2022)
 Walt Disney Studios Sony Pictures Releasing CIS (WDSSPR CIS) (2007–2020, with partnership from Sony Pictures Entertainment)
 Radio Disney Russia (2013–2022)
 Fox Networks Group Russia (Baby TV, FOX, FOX Life, National Geographic, National Geographic Wild)

Filmography
The first feature film produced by Disney Russia was The Book of Masters released in 2009. Disney Russia planned to make two new films in the summer of 2011, but after the lackluster financial results of The Book of Masters Disney Russia abandoned those plans. The next feature film from Disney Russia was The Last Warrior released in 2017.

 Feature films
 The Book of Masters (2009)
 The Last Warrior (2017)
 The Last Warrior: Root of Evil (2020)
 The Last Warrior: A Messenger of Darkness (2021)

 TV and short films
 As the Bell Rings, TV series (2010–2012)
 After School, TV series (2012)
 Rules of Style, fashion show (2013–2019)
 That's My Room!, home renovation show (2015–2017)
 Happiness is..., collection of short films (2015)
 Best Friends, game show (2018)
 Happiness Is... Part 2, collection of short films (2019)

See also
 The Walt Disney Company Italy
 The Walt Disney Company India
 The Walt Disney Company France

References

External links
 

Companies based in Moscow
CIS
Entertainment companies established in 2006
Russian companies established in 2006
Film production companies of Russia
Television networks in Russia